The Folkeslunda Limestone is a thin limestone and mudstone geologic formation of Sweden. The formation crops out on the island of Öland to the east of Kalmar, where Folkeslunda is located. Other exposures of the formation are in Dalarna, Jämtland and Östergötland.

The formation preserves fossils dating back to the late Darriwilian (Lasnamägi stage in the regional stratigraphy) of the Middle Ordovician period, dating to 463.5 to 460.9 Ma.

Erratic blocks of the same formation are also found in Germany (Mecklenburg-Vorpommern) and along the Vistula River in Bydgoszcz and in Żary, Lower Silesia, Poland.

Description 
Ordovician sedimentary rocks are exposed in patches across the southern half of Sweden. The northernmost exposure is surrounding the Siljan Ring, a Devonian impact crater in Dalarna. Other outcrops are found west and south of Örebro, northeast of Livköping, west and southwest of Skövde and surrounding Falköping. Underlying the Granby crater, west of Linköping, the Ordovician has a larger exposure. The southernmost Ordovician outcrops are situated in Skåne, due east of Lund and at the southeastern tip of Sweden.

Most of the island of Öland consists of Ordovician sediments, where Folkeslunda is located, the namesake for the formation. Previous names for the formation were Upper Grey Orthoceratite Limestone, Chiron Limestone, Centaurus Limestone and Schroeteri Limestone (lower part). The type section is located in the southeastern part of the parish of Långlöt and the northeastern part of the parish of Runsten on Öland. The best section of the unit on Öland is in a quarry close to the road from Vedby to Bäcklunda, east of Hornsjön.

The formation is the uppermost unit in the traditional Orthoceras Limestone of Sweden, overlying the Seby Limestone and the Folkesunda Limestone is overlain by the Furudal Limestone. The Folkeslunda Limestone dates to the Lasnamägi stage, part of the Purtse, belonging to the Virunian in the regional stratigraphy of Sweden, corresponding to a late Darriwilian age of the Middle Ordovician.

Lithologies 

The upper half of the formation consists of thick-bedded calcarenitic limestones. In Kårgärde, the formation comprises medium-bedded, coarse-grained, grey to dark grey limestones with chamositic grains in some beds. Other parts of the formation contain finely nodular lime mudstones and mudstones, and thick-bedded, coarse grained, in part coquinoid grey to dark grey limestones.

The depositional environment of the limestone has been interpreted as reef platform facies.

Erratic boulders 
Erratic boulders belonging to the formation have been found in Mecklenburg-Vorpommern, Germany and Lubusz and Kuyavia-Pomerania, Poland. The German boulder was described by Schlotheim (1820) and Boll (1857). Boll's collection is fortunately preserved at the regional Müritz Museum of Waren, Mecklenburg. Dzik (1984) described and illustrated Ordovician nautiloids of the erratic boulders in Poland.

Paleontology 
With respect to both fauna and lithology, the unit in the Siljan District resembles its development on Öland. The fauna shares many common species with the Seby Limestone, but is also distinct with respect to the cephalopods and hyolithids. Faunal differences with respect to the underlying formation were notes in the phosphatic brachiopod fauna, although the dominant species is the same as in the Seby Limestone. Trilobites from the Folkeslunda Limestone were described by Holm (1883) and Törnquist (1884), while Janusson (1957) described ostracods. Species of nautiloid cephalopods were reported by Holm in 1896, Troedsson (1931, 1932), and Kröger (2004). Biostratigraphically, the Folkeslunda Limestone spans the Pygodus serra conodont zone and the Eoplacoghnathus reclinatus subzone.

Correlations 
The Eoplacoghnathus reclinatus subzone extends from the lowermost part of the Folkeslunda Limestone into the lower part of the Furudal Limestone. The subzone index
species is not common outside Baltoscandia but has been recorded from a few localities in eastern North America (Bergström 1973), Argentina (Albanesi & Ortega 2002), and China (Zhang 1998).

Fossil content 

The following fossils have been found in the rocks belonging to the formation:

See also 

 List of fossiliferous stratigraphic units in Sweden
 Alum Shale Formation, Scandinavia
 Letná Formation, Czech Republic
 Fezouata Formation, Morocco
 San Juan Formation, Argentina
 Sella Formation, Bolivia

References

Bibliography

Further reading 

 B. Kröger, Y. Zhang, and M. Isakar. 2009. Discosorids and Oncocerids (Cephalopoda) of the Middle Ordovician Kunda and Aseri Regional Stages of Baltoscandia and the early evolution of these groups. Geobios 42:273-293
 D. H. Evans. 2005. The Lower and Middle Ordovician cephalopod faunas of England and Wales. Monograph of the Palaeontographical Society 623:1-81
 J. Dzik and G. N. Kiselev. 1995. The Baltic nautiloids Cyrtoceras ellipticum Lossen 1860, C. priscum Eichwald 1861, and Orthoceras damesi Krause 1877. Paläontologische Zeitschrift 69(1/2):61-71
 V. Jaanusson. 1963. Lower and Middle Viruan (Middle Ordovician) of the Siljan district. Bulletin of Geological Institutions of the University of Uppsala 42(3):1-40
 V. Jaanusson. 1962. The Lower and Middle Viruan sequence in two borings in Östergotland, central Sweden. Bulletin of Geological Institutions of the University of Uppsala 38(9):1-30
 V. Jaanusson. 1960. The Viruan (Middle Ordovician) of Öland. Bulletin of the Geological Institutions of the University of Uppsala 38:207-287

Geologic formations of Sweden
Ordovician System of Europe
Ordovician Sweden
Ordovician southern paleotemperate deposits
Darriwilian
Limestone formations
Mudstone formations
Open marine deposits
Paleontology in Sweden
Paleontology in Germany
Paleontology in Poland